Ryan Scott Greene (born 25 June 1973) is a Canadian actor, most known for his portrayal of Marcus in the MyNetworkTV telenovela Saints & Sinners. Other notable works include Queer as Folk, Carolina and Beach Girls.

Filmography and other appearances

External links 

Official Website

1973 births
Canadian male television actors
Canadian male film actors
Living people
Male actors from Halifax, Nova Scotia